Oscar Luther "Puss" Derrick (November 29, 1883 – July, 1965) was a college football player.

Clemson College
Derrick was a lineman for the Clemson Tigers of Clemson University from 1903 to 1906, selected All-Southern every year he played. Derrick was still mentioned for an all-time Clemson team in 1960.

1903
He was a member of John Heisman's SIAA champion 1903 team with the likes of Hope Sadler and Carl Sitton

1905
In 1905, a year in which Derrick was captain, John de Saulles sums up Derrick's play; he "is a veteran player who, by steady improvement has put himself in the first rank of linesmen. He was the mainstay of the Clemson season and no other Southern player could so satisfactorily fill this important position; hence, to balance the team and utilize the best of the material available, he is shifted from center to guard."

References

American football tackles
American football guards
Clemson Tigers football players
All-Southern college football players
1883 births
Players of American football from South Carolina
People from Chapin, South Carolina
1965 deaths
American football centers